Mutebi I was Kabaka of the Kingdom of Buganda between 1674 and 1680. He was the fifteenth (15th) Kabaka of Buganda.

Claim to the throne
He was the son of Kabaka Kateregga Kamegere, Kabaka of Buganda, who reigned between  1644 and 1674. His mother was Namutebi of the Mamba clan, the eighth (8th) wife of his father. He ascended the throne following the death of his father in 1674. He established his capital at Muguluka.

Married Life
He married five (5) wives:
 Nabitalo, daughter of Walusimbi, of the Ffumbe clan
 Nabukalu, daughter of Ndugwa, of the Lugave clan
 Naluyima, daughter of Nakatanza, of the Lugave clan
 Namawuba, daughter of Natiigo, of the Lugave clan
 Nampiima, daughter of Kibale, of the Mpeewo clan.

Issue
He fathered seven (7) sons:
 Prince (Omulangira) Lukenge, whose mother was Nabitalo
 Kabaka Tebandeke Mujambula, Kabaka of Buganda, who reigned between 1704 and 1724, whose mother was Nabukalu
 Prince (Omulangira) Mpiima, whose mother was Nampiima
 Prince (Omulangira) Kayima, whose mother was Naluyima
 Prince (Omulangira) Mawuba, whose mother was Namawuba
 Prince (Omulangira) Mukama, whose mother was Namawuba
 Prince (Omulangira) Matumbwe, whose mother was Namawuba

The final years
He died at Mbalwa and was buried there. Other credible sources put his burial place at Kongojje, Busiro.

Succession table

See also
 Kabaka of Buganda

References

External links
List of the Kings of Buganda

Kabakas of Buganda
17th-century African people
1680 deaths